Glasgow is a city in and the county seat of Valley County, Montana, United States, the population was 3,202 at the 2020 census.

Both Amtrak and the National Weather Service operate facilities in Glasgow that link the city to the surrounding region.

History
Native Americans inhabited the region for centuries, and extensive buffalo and pronghorn antelope herds provided ample food for the nomadic tribes. The Nakoda, Lakota, and Dakota peoples alternately inhabited and claimed the region from the 16th to the late 19th centuries. In 1804 the Lewis and Clark Expedition came within  of the future site of Glasgow and noted the extensive herds of buffalo and various game. In 1851, the US government formed the first treaty with the Native American tribes, in 1885 the tribes engaged in the last known buffalo hunt in the region, and in 1887, a treaty was signed where the tribes  , which led from 1888 to the formation of the Fort Peck Indian Reservation and the removal of the tribes from the Glasgow area.

Glasgow was founded in 1887 as a railroad town by James Hill, who was responsible for creating many communities along the Hi-Line. He and a local railroader named the town when they spun a globe and their finger landed on Glasgow, Scotland. Glasgow grew during the 1930s when President Franklin D. Roosevelt authorized the construction of the Fort Peck Dam, which became a major source of employment for the Glasgow area.

During World War II, the Glasgow Army Airfield housed the 96th Bombardment Squadron and 614th Bombardment Squadron, flying B-17 Flying Fortresses, at different times during the war. Starting in December 1944, a German POW camp was established at the facility, lasting until the end of the war. After the war ended the base was closed, and part of the facility eventually became the present day Glasgow Airport. Glasgow was the death place of Lieutenant Colonel Ronald Speirs, famed member of Easy Company, 101st Airborne.

In the 1960s, the population rose to about 6,400 due to the nearby presence of the Glasgow Air Force Base, (SAC air command and housing B-52 bombers) used during the Vietnam War and the earlier part of the Cold War. A significant amount of mid-century modern and Googie-style architecture was built then. After the de-activation and closure of the base in 1969, Glasgow's population declined to about half its one-time size by 1990, when the loss rate stabilized. Glasgow currently functions as the major regional administrative, shopping and services hub for Valley County and some of the areas beyond.

Geography and climate
Glasgow is located at  (48.198252, −106.635402).

Using data from Oxford University's Big Data Institute, The Washington Post, in 2018, identified Glasgow as "the middle of nowhere" for the contiguous United States. The article stated "Of all towns with more than 1,000 residents, Glasgow... is farthestabout 4.5 hours in any directionfrom any metropolitan area of more than 75,000 people".

Glasgow experiences a continental semi-arid climate (Köppen climate classification BSk) with long, dry winters with typically freezing but exceedingly variable temperatures and hot, dry summers. The extreme variability of winter temperatures is due to the large warming produced by chinook winds as air descending from the Rockies is warmed, contrasting with very cold continental air masses typical of inland locations at this latitude. As an illustration, the record cold month of February 1936 averaged , but the two warmest Februaries of 1931 and 1984 averaged above  and had mean maxima above . Tornadoes are a rare occurrence. Two F2 tornadoes did, however, hit the Glasgow area on June 25, 1975.

Economy
As of May 2012, the major industries present in Glasgow are retail (23% of employment), public administration (16%), construction (14%), and health care and social assistance (7%). Farmers and farm services comprise 4% of employment. , the unemployment rate was 3.2%.

The median home price was an estimated $82,005 in 2009.

Education
Glasgow is served by the Glasgow School District. There are three public schools in the district: Glasgow High School, Glasgow Middle School, and Irle Elementary. Glasgow High School has a student population of 232. The remaining K–8 schools have 563 students, for a total of 795 in the public school system. They are known as the Scotties.

For Glasgow's residents aged 25 years and over, 81.5% of them attained at least a high school diploma, with 17.0% attaining at least a bachelor's degree, with 6.2% attaining a graduate or professional degree.

Glasgow City-County Library serves the area.

Sports
The Scotties of Glasgow High School have won 48 Montana state championships in their storied history. Glasgow High School currently offers thirteen sports for students grades 9–12 (football, volleyball, boys and girls cross country, boys and girls wrestling, boys and girls basketball, softball, boys and girls track and field, and boys and girls golf). They have been competing at the Class B level (40 schools) in the MHSA (Montana High School Association) since the 1992–93 school year.  They have won 14 state championships and 33 state trophies in boys wrestling. The 33 trophies are more than other Class A, B, or C School in Montana. They have also won an ALL–class state record 16 Girls Cross Country Championships.

The Glasgow Reds baseball team competes at the Montana American Legion ClassA level (31 teams). They finished second at state in 2000 and 2012 and third in 1999, 2013, and 2015.

Crime
There were no reports of rape or murder occurring in Glasgow in 2010, compared with one murder the previous year, and 16 incidents of rape from 2003 to 2008. Overall, the crime rate to 2010 appears to be in a general downward trend, and is well below the national average.

A new sheriff's detention facility was completed in April 2011 at a cost of $3.16million. The detention center houses inmates from local police and sheriff, as well as regional inmates for agencies such as the FBI, U.S. Marshals Service and Montana Highway Patrol and has an average of 16 inmates on any given day.

Demographics

As of the 2010 census, there were 3,250 people, 1,479 households, and 834 families residing in the city. The racial makeup of the city was 91.8% white, .2% African American, 4.5% Native American, .3% Asian, .4% from other races, and 2.7% from two or more races. Hispanic or Latino of any race were 1.8% of the population.

There were 1,479 households, of which 26.6% had children under the age of 18 living with them, 43.5% were married couples living together, 9.1% had a female householder with no husband present, 3.8% had a male householder with no wife present, and 43.6% were non-families. 39.7% of all households were made up of individuals, and 19.6% had someone living alone who was 65 years of age or older. The average household size was 2.13 and the average family size was 2.85.

The median age in the city was 45.6 years. 22.7% of residents were under the age of 18; 5.2% were between the ages of 18 and 24; 21.3% were from 25 to 44; 28% were from 45 to 64; and 22.7% were 65 years of age or older. The gender makeup of the city was 47.8% male and 52.2% female.

The median income for a household in the city was $35,504. 14.5% of the population were below the federal poverty line, compared to 15.1% for the USA as a whole.

Notable people
 Stacy Edwards, actress
 Michael McFaul, former United States Ambassador to Russia
 Donald Grant Nutter, 15th governor of Montana
 Tony Raines, NASCAR driver
 Steve Reeves, bodybuilder and actor
 Jerry Rosholt, journalist and author
 Brian Salonen, NFL player
 Anthony Washington, three-time Olympic discus thrower
 Julie Golob, professional sharpshooter and competition shooter
 Ann Hould-Ward, Tony-winning costume designer
 Uan Rasey, trumpeter who played on several motion picture soundtracks in the 1950s and 1960s

Transportation

Rail

Glasgow is on the Hi-Line of the BNSF Railway and is served daily westbound and eastbound by Amtrak's Empire Builder route.

Air
Glasgow is served by Glasgow Airport and has daily commercial service to Billings. The current commercial air service provider for the Glasgow Airport is Cape Air.

Bus
Glasgow and the greater Valley County region are served by a non-profit taxi/bus service called Valley Country Transit. Bus and/or Van rides are available daily for in-county travel purposes. Riders are charged on a per trip basis and must call in a ride.
As of 2022, the transportation service, Uber is also now in operation within city limits.

Roads
Glasgow is located on U.S. Highway 2, which is a major east-west traffic corridor of the northern Great Plains region. Montana Highway 24 passes nearby the city, a major north-south route connecting southern Montana to Canada. No Interstates run near the region.

Media
Glasgow is part of the Glendive Media Market, as of 2021, the smallest tracked by Neilson serving an estimated 3,900 homes.

Newspaper
The Glasgow Courier, established in 1913 and published every Wednesday, is the newspaper of record for Valley County,
 The BS Buzz, is a daily newspaper for Glasgow.  The Buzz is published Monday thru Friday.

Local radio stations

 KLTZ-AM 1240
 KLAN-FM 93.5

Local television stations

 K18BN-D (18.1 PBJ) UHF 18

References

External links

 
 Glasgow Area Chamber of Commerce
 Two Rivers Economic Growth

Cities in Valley County, Montana
County seats in Montana
Populated places established in 1887
Cities in Montana